XHHIT-FM is a commercial radio station located in Tecate, Baja California, Mexico broadcasting to the Tijuana, Baja California area on 95.3 FM. XHHIT airs a variety hits format branded as La Lupe.

History
XHATE-FM received its concession on November 7, 1988. It was owned by Enrique Regules Uriegas, who owned several stations for Multimedios.

In 1993, XHATE moved from 99.3 to 95.3 MHz. The move served as part of a bigger frequency shuffle that moved XHKY-FM to 99.3 and US station KKOS to 95.7.

On May 18, 2004, XHATE became XHHIT-FM; at the time, it was carrying Multimedios's Stereo Hits format.

On August 31, 2020, after having taken the Regional Mexican format of ¨La Caliente¨, it changed its format to La Lupe of adult hits in Spanish.

References

External links
Multimedios Radio website

1988 establishments in Mexico
Radio stations established in 1988
Mass media in Tecate
Radio stations in Baja California
Spanish-language radio stations
Multimedios Radio